Cordingley is a surname. Notable people with the surname include:

Albert Cordingley, English cricketer
Patrick Cordingley, British general
Sam Cordingley, Australian rugby union footballer
Steve Cordingley, English cricketer
Troy Cordingley (born 1967), Canadian lacrosse player and coach

See also
Georges Ricard-Cordingley, French artist
Cordingly, a surname